Since the inception of international association football matches, 28 Belgium male footballers have scored three or more goals (a hat-trick) in a game. The first player to score a hat-trick for Belgium was Pierre-Joseph Destrebecq, while on the books of Union Saint-Gilloise, in a friendly match against France in 1905. Three players, Robert De Veen, Bert De Cleyn and Josip Weber, have scored five goals in one match. De Veen also scored the greatest number of hat-tricks, with three.

Belgium have conceded 44 hat-tricks since 1904, the most recent being scored by Haris Seferovic in a 2–5 UEFA Nations League loss against Switzerland. Undoubtedly, the most famous hat-trick against Belgium came during the 1986 FIFA World Cup, when Belgium overcame three goals by Ihor Belanov to move past the Soviet Union into the quarter finals.

Hat-tricks for Belgium

Note

Hat-tricks conceded by Belgium
Belgium have conceded 44 hat-tricks.

Notes

 The result is presented with Belgium's score first.

References

Belgium
Hat-tricks
Association football player non-biographical articles